, also known as the , was a Japanese poet and courtier.

The poet Fujiwara no Kanesuke was his cousin and son-in-law and his son Asatada was also a poet. He had another son by the name of Fujiwara no Tomoyori and his father was Fujiwara no Takafuji.

He was appointed as Udajin of the Third Ward and we see him in storied from the Tales of Yamato. 19 poems can be found in the Imperial Anthologies, and he also had a private collection of poems.

Poetry
One of his poems is included in Ogura Hyakunin Isshu:

References

External links
 Biography and e-text of his poems in Japanese.

873 births
932 deaths
Japanese poets
Fujiwara clan
Hyakunin Isshu poets